A list of film serials by year of release.

1910s

1920s

1930s
Films still exist from this point on unless noted otherwise:

1940s

1950s

See also
 Serial (film)
 List of film serials by studio

References

External links
Serial Squadron
Silent Era
Todd Gault's Movie Serial Experience
In The Balcony

Serials
Film serials